Vivian Segnini (born 3 January 1989) is a former Brazilian tennis player.

On 24 October 2011, she achieved her career-high singles ranking of world No. 275. On 2 April 2012, she peaked at No. 244 in the doubles rankings. Only three months later, she had her last appearance on the ITF Circuit when she lost in the third round of the qualifying competition of a $25,000 event in Torun, Poland.

She is currently head coach of the Winthrop University’s Women’s Tennis team.

ITF Circuit finals

Singles: 12 (1–11)

Doubles: 11 (5–6)

External links
 
 

1989 births
Living people
People from São Carlos
Brazilian female tennis players
Tennis players at the 2011 Pan American Games
Pan American Games competitors for Brazil
Sportspeople from São Paulo (state)
20th-century Brazilian women
21st-century Brazilian women